The Bura Jats are a Jat caste found in the state of Haryana in India.

Present circumstances 

The Bura Jats is local rural group of Haryana. They speak Haryanvi among themselves and Hindi with outsiders.

References 

Brahmins
Caste
Haryana